Albert George DeMarco, Sr. (May 10, 1916 – May 25, 1989) was a Canadian professional ice hockey player. DeMarco started his National Hockey League career with the Chicago Black Hawks. He would also play with the New York Rangers, Boston Bruins and Toronto Maple Leafs. He played in the NHL from 1938 to 1947. He played several years in minor professional hockey until 1952, and played on in senior amateur hockey in his hometown of North Bay during the 1950s.

Career
Albert was born in North Bay, Ontario. He played junior and minor hockey from 1933 until 1937, when he became a professional with the Baltimore Orioles of the Eastern American Hockey League. DeMarco signed with the Chicago Black Hawks in 1938, splitting time with the Providence Reds of the International-American Hockey League. After two seasons, the Hawks traded DeMarco to Providence, where he played until 1943. In the 1942–43 season, DeMarco was loaned to the Toronto Maple Leafs, then traded to the Boston Bruins. The following November, he was traded by Boston to the New York Rangers. He remained with the Rangers before being traded to the Cleveland Barons of the American Hockey League in 1947. It was the end of his NHL career, but DeMarco played for Cleveland, the Washington Lions and Buffalo Bisons for another five years. In 1952, DeMarco returned to his hometown and played for the senior North Bay Trappers for several more years. His last full season of play was 1954–55. He moved into coaching and played only occasionally until 1959.

DeMarco's overtime goal in the 1943 playoffs against Montreal eliminated the Canadiens; it would be the last time the Bruins defeated Montreal in a playoff series for the next 45 years.

DeMarco's son Ab Jr. also played in the NHL.

Career statistics

Regular season and playoffs

Awards
 Won John B. Sollenberger Trophy (Top Scorer- AHL) (1951) 	  	
 Won Les Cunningham Award (MVP- AHL) (1951) 	  	
 1st All-Star Team (AHL 1950-51) 	  	
 2nd All-Star Teams: (EAHL 1937-38) (AHL 1949-50)

Transactions
Signed as a free agent by Chicago, September 28, 1938. 	  	
Traded to Providence (AHL) by Chicago for cash, May 14, 1940. 	  	
Loaned to Toronto by Providence (AHL) with the trade of Buck Jones for the loan of Jack Forsey and George Boothman, February 3, 1943. 	  	
Traded to Boston by Providence (AHL) with Oscar Aubuchon and Norm Calladine for cash, March 8, 1943. 	  	
Traded to NY Rangers by Boston for cash, November 1943. 	  	
Traded to Detroit by NY Rangers with Hank Goldup for Flash Hollett, June 19, 1946. Transaction voided when Hollett decided to retire, June, 1946. 	  	
Traded to Cleveland (AHL) by NY Rangers with Joe Cooper for cash, May 5, 1947. 	  	
Traded to Washington (AHL) by Cleveland (AHL) with Bryan Hextall Sr. for Dan Porteous and Ken Schultz, January 20, 1949. 	  	
Traded to Montreal (Buffalo- AHL) by Washington (AHL) for George Robertson with Montreal retaining right of recall, January 28, 1949.

References

External links

1916 births
1989 deaths
Baltimore Orioles (ice hockey) players
Boston Bruins players
Canadian expatriates in the United States
Canadian ice hockey centres
Canadian people of Italian descent
Chicago Blackhawks players
Cleveland Barons (1937–1973) players
Ice hockey people from Ontario
New York Rangers players
Ontario Hockey Association Senior A League (1890–1979) players
Providence Reds players
Sportspeople from North Bay, Ontario
Toronto Maple Leafs players
Washington Lions players